Bones and All is a 2022 romantic horror film directed by Luca Guadagnino from a screenplay by David Kajganich, based on the 2015 novel Bones & All by Camille DeAngelis. The film stars Taylor Russell and Timothée Chalamet as a pair of young cannibals who flee together on a road trip across the country and develop feelings for each other. Michael Stuhlbarg, André Holland, Chloë Sevigny, David Gordon Green, Jessica Harper, Jake Horowitz, and Mark Rylance appear in supporting roles.

Bones and All had its world premiere at the 79th Venice International Film Festival on September 2, 2022, where it won the Silver Lion for best direction and the Marcello Mastroianni for Russell. The film was released theatrically in the United States on November 18, by United Artists Releasing, and elsewhere by Warner Bros. Pictures, with the exception of Italy, where it was distributed by Vision Distribution. The film received positive reviews, with critics praising the performances of Russell, Chalamet and Rylance, Guadagino's direction, the cinematography, score, and fusion of genres.

Plot 
In 1988 Virginia, teenager Maren Yearly sneaks out to attend a sleepover with her classmates, where she bites through a girl's finger, partially severing it. Once she runs back home covered in blood, her father Frank swiftly relocates them to Maryland. Shortly after Maren's eighteenth birthday, Frank abandons her, leaving behind some cash, her birth certificate, and a cassette tape. On the tape, he recounts the story of Maren's first cannibalistic episode, when she killed her babysitter at the age of three. As similar incidents continued to occur over the years, although Frank helped his daughter evade consequences, he grew increasingly anguished over her apparent lack of remorse. He concludes with the hope that she will someday learn to overcome her urges.

Maren decides to head to Minnesota, which is listed as the birth place of her mother, Janelle, who left her and Frank when Maren was only a baby. She is approached at a bus station in Columbus by Sully, an eccentric man and fellow "eater", who informs her that their kind can identify one another by scent. He leads her to a house wherein the owner, an elderly woman, is near death. Maren awakens in the morning to find Sully devouring the woman's corpse and joins him. Sully seems interested in taking Maren under his wing, but she flees the house soon after.

While shoplifting supplies in Indiana, Maren defends a woman from being harassed by a male customer. Having witnessed the scene, a young man named Lee antagonizes the customer; Maren later finds Lee outside, having just fed off the man. Lee steals his victim's truck and offers to bring Maren along, agreeing to help her find her mother after they spend the night at the man's vacant house. As they embark on a cross-country road trip, the two fall in love. During a brief stay in Lee's hometown in Kentucky, Maren notices his unwillingness to discuss certain aspects of his past, such as his father's absence and the reason why Lee avoids being spotted around town. His younger sister, Kayla, who is unaware of his true nature, chastises him for his constant departures and unannounced arrivals.

At one point, Maren and Lee are approached by what appears to be another pair of eaters, Jake and Brad. However, Maren is revolted when Brad discloses he does not share the others' cravings, instead choosing to engage in cannibalism. Jake also talks about the intensity of the experience of consuming a body in its entirety rather than just feeding off its flesh, though Lee and Maren are initially skeptical. Unnerved, they drive away once the men have fallen asleep. After Maren expresses hunger during a stop at a local carnival, Lee cruises a male booth worker and kills him. Once they have feasted on the body, Maren is overcome with guilt upon discovering that the man was married and had a family, which leads to an argument with Lee.

Maren is able to locate the home of her maternal grandmother, Barbara, who had no prior knowledge of her existence. Barbara tells her that Janelle, who she and her husband adopted at birth, voluntarily admitted herself into a psychiatric hospital in Fergus Falls several years before. Maren finally reunites with her mother, whom she is shocked to find has self-cannibalized her own hands. She reads a letter that Janelle wrote to her in case they were to ever meet again, which concludes with Janelle's belief that Maren would be better off dead than living as a "monster". Janelle then attacks her daughter before being restrained by a nurse. Refusing to go down the same path as her mother, Maren leaves while Lee is asleep and is soon approached by Sully, who has been stalking her. She rebukes his offer to become companions, causing him to angrily curse at her before departing. Once he realizes Maren is gone, a devastated Lee decides to return home.

Maren eventually makes her way back to Kentucky. She runs into Kayla, who reveals that, on the night of her and Lee's alcoholic, abusive father's disappearance, he beat both of his children before mysteriously vanishing while Kayla ran to get the police. Having been considered the prime suspect, Lee was cleared of involvement once it was proven that the blood that was found on him was his own. After the pair is reunited, they rekindle their relationship and decide to travel westward. Lee tells Maren that he realized his father was also an eater when he bit Lee during their scuffle, tearfully confessing that he hid his father away before feeding off him and that he enjoyed the thrill it gave him. He asks Maren if she thinks he is a bad person, but she declares her love for him, and the two decide to abstain from cannibalism and attempt to lead a normal life together.

Sometime later, they are living happily in Ann Arbor, Michigan, where Maren works at a university bookstore. She returns home one day to find Sully has broken into their apartment, and he taunts her with a knife. After Lee returns, the couple succeeds in killing Sully, but Lee is fatally wounded in the struggle. While searching Sully's satchel, Maren finds locks of Kayla's hair and they realize that she has fallen victim to Sully. As he lies in Maren's arms, Lee expresses his wish for Maren to eat him as he dies, "bones and all", which Maren frantically refuses at first, but eventually complies.

Cast
 Taylor Russell as Maren Yearly
 Timothée Chalamet as Lee
 Mark Rylance as Sully
 André Holland as Frank Yearly, Maren's father
 Michael Stuhlbarg as Jake
 Chloë Sevigny as Janelle Kerns, Maren's mother
 David Gordon Green as Brad
 Jessica Harper as Barbara Kerns, Maren's grandmother
 Jake Horowitz as Lance, a carnival worker whom Lee picks up
 Kendle Coffey as Sherry
 Anna Cobb as Kayla, Lee's sister

Production
On April 8, 2019, it was announced that David Kajganich would adapt Camille DeAngelis's 2015 novel Bones & All for the screen, and that the film would be directed by Antonio Campos. On January 28, 2021, it was announced that Taylor Russell and Timothée Chalamet would star in the film, now to be directed by Luca Guadagnino. Chalamet is also a producer on the film. Filming began in May, by which time Mark Rylance, Michael Stuhlbarg, André Holland, Jessica Harper, Chloë Sevigny, Francesca Scorsese, and David Gordon Green had joined the cast. Shooting took place in Chillicothe, Ohio and Cincinnati, Ohio, which makes it Guadagnino's first film set and made in the United States. Production was affected by break-ins that occurred for some of the crew's cars, leading to a request being submitted to Cincinnati City Council in late June to provide $50,000 for increased security. While there was some criticism over the proposed use of taxpayer funds for a private enterprise, City Council ultimately passed a measure to grant the funds. Filming wrapped in July 2021.

Executive producers are Giovanni Corrado and Raffaella Viscardi. The film is fully financed by Italian companies: The Apartment (a Fremantle group society), 3 Marys, Memo, Tender Stories, Adler, Elafood, Elafilm, Manila, Serfis and Wise.

Guadagnino said that Bones and All is "a very romantic story, about the impossibility of love and yet, the need for it. Even in extreme circumstances." He also said that Chalamet and Russell have "a gleaming power" and are able to "portray universal feelings".

Marketing
The first teaser for Bones and All was released on August 10, 2022. American artist Elizabeth Peyton was commissioned by director Luca Guadagnino to create a painting based on the film. The resulting painting, which she titled "Kiss (Bones and All)", was turned into the film's first poster, which was on display during the Venice International Film Festival, hanging on the 13th-century palace Ca' da Mosto in Venice.

The official poster for the film was released on September 29, 2022, accompanied by its first trailer, which featured a rendition of Leonard Cohen's "You Want It Darker". The song was chosen by lead actor Timothée Chalamet. Safeeyah Kazi of Collider called the trailer "chilling" and "intense". Toussaint Egan of Polygon noted similarities to 1994's crime thriller Natural Born Killers. Allegra Frank of The Daily Beast called it "gorgeously bloody", and praised it for not sharing too much information. Lauren Milici of Total Film described the trailer as Let The Right One In meets Bonnie and Clyde." An extended trailer was released on October 5, 2022.

Music

The film's score was composed by Trent Reznor and Atticus Ross and was released on November 18, 2022, on Reznor's label The Null Corporation. In an interview with TheWrap, Reznor and Ross explained that they had extensive discussions with Guadagnino regarding the score, who stated that he wanted it to be "a melancholic elegy, an unending longing. It needs to be a character in the film, a part of the landscape" and requested the use of acoustic guitars to complement the Americana visuals. Reznor and Ross noted how the duo had to experiment with a lot of different sounds before figuring out how the score would sit in the film and explained the creation of the film's original song "(You Made It Feel) Like Home", which stemmed from their personal connections to Russell and Chalamet's characters.

Release
Bones and All had its world premiere at the 79th Venice International Film Festival on September 2, 2022, followed by screenings at the 60th New York Film Festival, 17th Fantastic Fest, 49th Telluride Film Festival, 2022 AFI Fest and 2022 BFI London Film Festival. It had a limited theatrical release beginning on November 18, 2022, before opening wide on November 23.

Theatrical
It is the first film to be acquired by United Artists Releasing and Metro-Goldwyn-Mayer Pictures following its merger deal with Amazon on March 17, 2022. Vision Distribution released the film in Italy on November 23, 2022, in collaboration with Prime Video and Sky, while Warner Bros. Pictures handled all other international territories through MGM and UAR under a new multi-year pact with the former beginning with this film.

Home media
The film was available on rental PVOD on December 13, 2022. It was released on Blu-ray and DVD, on January 31, 2023, by Warner Bros. Home Entertainment.

Reception

Box office
Bones and All grossed $7.8 million in the United States and Canada, and $6.7 million in other territories for a worldwide total of $14.5 million; it underperformed against a $16–20 million budget.

In its limited opening weekend, Bones and All grossed $120,000 from five theaters. The film expanded alongside Glass Onion: A Knives Out Mystery, Strange World, Devotion, and the wide expansion of The Fabelmans, and was projected to gross around $7–9 million from 2,727 theaters over its five-day opening weekend. It made $921,000 on its first day, including $345,000 from Tuesday night previews. It went on to debut to $2.7 million (including $3.5 million over the five days), finishing in eighth. In its third weekend of release, the film made $1.2 million. Its underperformance in the United States was attributed to the increasing decline of interest in prestige films by the general public in a moviegoing environment altered by the COVID-19 pandemic, despite being a film of the horror genre, which saw a surge in popularity during the summer with the releases of Nope, Barbarian and Smile.

The film debuted first at the Italian box office, grossing a total of €109.036 (USD$113,643).

Critical response
  Audiences polled by CinemaScore gave the film an average grade of "B" on an A+ to F scale, while those at PostTrak gave it an overall positive score of 71%, including an average three out of five stars.

Reviewing the film following its premiere at Venice, where it received a 10-minute standing ovation, Peter Bradshaw of The Guardian called it an "extravagant and outrageous movie: scary, nasty and startling in its warped romantic idealism" and gave the film a perfect rating of 5 stars. Stephanie Zacharek, in her review for Time, wrote "Bones and All is fastidiously romantic. It's so carefully made, and so lovely to look at, even at its grisliest", praising the direction and cast performances, particularly Russell's. Taylor Russell, Timothée Chalamet, and Mark Rylance have received acclaim for their performances with critics praising Russell and Chalamet's chemistry together. Bloody Disgusting called the duo "profound" and "touching and genuine". The Hollywood Reporter David Rooney also praised the duo, adding their performances are "unforced and underplayed to subtly stirring effect," while calling the film "strangely affecting, even poetic" and commending the direction and cinematography.

Leila Latif in her review for IndieWire wrote, "Bones & All is fundamentally a beautifully realized and devastating, tragic romance which at multiple moments would have Chekhov himself weeping as the trigger is pulled."  Richard Lawson of Vanity Fair called it an "alternately plodding and engrossing YA road movie" praising the cast performances, but ultimately found the film unsatisfactory, writing "Bones and All has its merits, but the film is only a decent side dish at the feast of Guadagnino." Writing for Sight & Sound, John Bleasdale described it as "wryly funny, gleefully entertaining and oddly touching" and praised the direction, cinematography, score, and cast performances. Comparing it to Call Me by Your Name, Selina Sondermann wrote "like two sides of the same coin – both cunningly display the love we find for ourselves when we are allowed to truly love another person, bones and all."

"There's real pleasure in Bones and All, an insistent sweetness that somehow both nourishes and cleanses away the horror" wrote Justin Chang in his review for the Los Angeles Times. Clint Worthington Flow of Consequence described the film as "an oddly sweet—presumably a little coppery, too, due to all the blood—alchemy of love and murder" and compared it to Badlands (1973) and Bonnie and Clyde (1967), with their tales of "lovers skirting human morality and forging their own sense of paradise with each other". In one unenthusiastic review, Slant's Keith Uhlich criticized the screenplay, direction, and cast performances, concluding: "Straining to be a YA spin on Trouble Every Day, Bones and All barely eclipses Twilight." Mick LaSalle, writing for the San Francisco Chronicle, provided a firmly negative review, criticizing the use of gore by saying "the problem is [cannibalism] can’t stay a metaphor" and "Guadagnino has a choice, whether to be an artist or just the maker of artistically rendered, conscientiously realized garbage."

Accolades

See also 
 List of Italian films of 2022

References

External links
 Official website (Italy)
 Official website (US)
 Bones and All at MGM Studios
 
 Official screenplay

2022 horror films
2022 independent films
2022 LGBT-related films
2022 romance films
2020s American films
2020s coming-of-age films
2020s English-language films
2020s Italian films
American coming-of-age films
American independent films
American LGBT-related films
American road movies
American romantic horror films
Coming-of-age romance films
English-language Italian films
Films about cannibalism
Films based on American novels
Films directed by Luca Guadagnino
Films impacted by the COVID-19 pandemic
Films scored by Atticus Ross
Films scored by Trent Reznor
Films set in the 1980s
Films set in Columbus, Ohio
Films set in Illinois
Films set in Indiana
Films set in Kentucky
Films set in Maryland
Films set in Michigan
Films set in Minnesota
Films set in Missouri
Films set in Nebraska
Films set in Virginia
Films shot in Cincinnati
Films shot in Indiana
Films shot in Kentucky
Films shot in Nebraska
Films shot in Ohio
Italian coming-of-age films
Italian horror films
Italian independent films
Italian LGBT-related films
Italian road movies
Italian romance films
LGBT-related coming-of-age films
LGBT-related horror films
LGBT-related romantic drama films
Male bisexuality in film
Metro-Goldwyn-Mayer films
Warner Bros. films